The Schipbeek is a tributary of the IJssel in the Netherlands and a continuation of the Buurserbeek. It flows into the IJssel near Deventer.

The real source of the Schipbeek is in Germany - in western Northrhine-Westphalia - in the Ahauser Aa, to which the Alstätter Aa, the Buurserbeek and finally the Schipbeek are connected.

References

Rivers of Gelderland
Rivers of Overijssel
Rivers of the Netherlands